Bhira may refer to:

 Bhira Hydroelectric Project, in Maharashtra, India
 Bhira Kheri, a town in Uttar Pradesh, India
 Sargis Bhira. a Christian monk who, according to Islamic tradition, foretold to Muhammad his future as a prophet